Andrey Grigoriev  (born 16 May 1984) is a Russian ski orienteering competitor.

He won a gold medal in the long distance and in the sprint relay at the 2011 World Ski Orienteering Championships.

References

1984 births
Living people
Russian orienteers
Ski-orienteers
21st-century Russian people